LPJ may refer to:

 London Progressive Journal, a UK-based weekly online magazine
 LPJ, the station code for Lalpur Jam railway station, Gujarat, India